Cyphostethus is a genus of true bugs belonging to the family Acanthosomatidae.

The species of this genus are found in Europe.

Species:

References

Acanthosomatidae
Hemiptera of Europe